Thallarcha lechrioleuca is a moth in the subfamily Arctiinae. It was described by Turner in 1940. It is found in Australia, where it has been recorded from South Australia, Victoria and Western Australia.

References

Moths described in 1940
Lithosiini